Russell Alphonse Rulau (September 21, 1926 – November 12, 2012) was an American numismatist.  He was involved in coin collecting for over 60 years. From his earliest days as a casual collector, Rulau contributed to numismatics as a writer, editor and club organizer. His interest in world coins led him to create the "Coin of the Year" award. The award is presented annually by Krause Publications' World Coin News. Rulau coined the term "exonumia" in 1960.

Literary career
While working for Amos Press, Rulau edited publications such as Coin World and Numismatic Scrapbook. He was also responsible for creating World Coins Magazine. 

He later worked for Krause Publications, and contributed to the editing of the World Coin News and Bank Note Reporter. He has also written several numismatic books, including How to Order Foreign Coins, Modern World Mint Marks, World Mint Marks, Hard Times Tokens, Early American Tokens, U.S. Merchant Tokens 1845-1860, U.S. Trade Tokens 1866-1889, Tokens of the Gay Nineties and Latin American Tokens. For many years, he also served as the North American representative for the Pobjoy Mint.

Numismatic Honours
In addition to the American Numismatic Association, Rulau was a member of various other numismatic groups. These include the American Numismatic Society, Royal Numismatic Society and the Royal Canadian Numismatic Association. He is also a recipient of the Numismatic Literary Guild's coveted Clemy Award, and several awards from the American Numismatic Association. These awards include the Glenn Smedley Memorial Award, Lifetime Achievement Award and Medal of Merit.

References

1926 births
American non-fiction writers
American numismatists
2012 deaths